Donald Johnson and Francisco Montana were the defending champions, but lost in the second round to Tomás Carbonell and Francisco Roig.

Jacco Eltingh and Paul Haarhuis won the title, defeating Todd Woodbridge and Mark Woodforde, 6–4, 6–2.

Seeds
Champion seeds are indicated in bold text while text in italics indicates the round in which those seeds were eliminated. The top four seeds received a bye to the second round.

Draw

Finals

Top half

Bottom half

References

Doubles